The 2019–20 Ford Trophy was the 49th season of The Ford Trophy, the List A cricket tournament in New Zealand. It was the ninth in a sponsorship deal between New Zealand Cricket and Ford Motor Company. It took place between November 2019 and February 2020. As per the previous edition of the competition, the tournament featured ten rounds of matches. Wellington were the defending champions.

Following the conclusion of the group stage, Auckland advanced directly to the final, with Canterbury and Otago progressing to the elimination final. In the elimination final, Otago beat Canterbury by six runs to progress to the final. In the final, Auckland beat Otago by two wickets to win the tournament.

Points table

 Teams qualified for the finals

Fixtures

Round 1

Round 2

Round 3

Round 4

Round 5

Round 6

Round 7

Round 8

Round 9

Round 10

Finals

References

External links
 Series home at ESPN Cricinfo

Ford Trophy
2019–20 New Zealand cricket season
Ford Trophy